Steroid-transporting ATPase (pleiotropic-drug-resistance protein, PDR protein) is an enzyme with systematic name ATP phosphohydrolase (steroid-exporting). This enzyme catalyses the following chemical reaction

 ATP + H2O + steroidin  ADP + phosphate + steroidout

This enzyme has two similar ATP-binding domains.

References

External links 
 

EC 3.6.3